The Peter Pan Stakes is a Grade III American Thoroughbred horse race for three-year-olds over a distance of  miles (nine furlongs) run annually during the second week of May at Belmont Park in Elmont, New York.

History
The race is run in honor of National Museum of Racing and Hall of Fame inductee, Peter Pan. Inaugurated in 1940, it was run as a handicap at one and one eighth miles until 1960 when the race was placed on hiatus. Revived at Aqueduct Racetrack in 1975, the Peter Pan Stakes was moved to Belmont Park for the 1976 running. It was contested at a distance of one mile until 1977 when it reverted to its traditional one and one eighth mile format. The race is considered a major preparatory race for the last leg of the Triple Crown, the Belmont Stakes since the race is held on the same track. In cases where a horse did not enter the Kentucky Derby several horses have won the Peter Pan Stakes  / Belmont Stakes double. These include High Gun (1954), Gallant Man (1957), Cavan (1958), Coastal (1979), A.P. Indy (1992), Tonalist (2014). Due to the effects of the COVID-19 pandemic, the 2020 Peter Pan Stakes was run on Opening Day at Saratoga Race Course.

Records
Speed record: (at current distance of  miles)
 1:46.35 – Oratory (2005)

Most wins by a jockey:
 4 – Eddie Maple (1975, 1993, 1995, 1997)

Most wins by a trainer:
 4 – Todd Pletcher (2004, 2006, 2015,2021)

Most wins by an owner:
 3 – C. V. Whitney (1945, 1951, 1956)

Winners
<div style="font-size:90%; float:left;">

References
 The Peter Pan Stakes at the NYRA
 The 2008 Peter Pan Stakes at the NTRA

Graded stakes races in the United States
Flat horse races for three-year-olds
Horse races in the United States
Belmont Park
Recurring sporting events established in 1940
1940 establishments in New York (state)